Ulla Kyllikki Katajavuori-Koskimies (16 June 1909, Rauma — 5 October 2001 Helsinki) was a Finnish musician who played the traditional Finnish kantele, performing from the 1930s to the 1990s. One of her recordings is the Karelian folk song Konevitsan kirkonkellot.

Katajavuori played the modern, multi-stringed version of the kantele, and was considered a virtuoso and maintainer of the tradition, especially during the 1960s when the instrument was of low popularity, and 5-string player Martti Pokela was one of the few other recognised musicians playing the instrument.


Discography
 Ulla Katajavuori: Grand Lady of Kantele. IMU-CD 101

Sources
 Helistö, Paavo: Ulla Katajavuori — kanteletar. Radio programme. Yle Radio 1, 2000.
 Helistö, Paavo: Ulla Katajavuori, kanteleen runoilija. Friiti 2/2000.
 Koskimies, Satu: Kanteleen Grand Lady. Kantele 4/2000.

References

Further reading
 
 Jalkanen, Pekka & Laitinen, Heikki & Tenhunen, Anna-Liisa: Kantele. Edited by Risto Blomster. Suomalaisen Kirjallisuuden Seura, 2010. 
 Koskimies, Satu: Te näitte mun soittoni riemun: Ulla Katajavuoren elämä. Tammi, 2003.

External links
 Ulla Katajavuori at 78-rpm

Kantele players
Finnish folk musical groups
1909 births
2001 deaths
People from Rauma, Finland